Eboda diakonoffi is a species of moth of the family Tortricidae.

It is native to Indonesia and Papua New Guinea,

It has been recorded from Fergusson Island of the D'Entrecasteaux Islands archipelago, and the Admiralty Islands, of Papua New Guinea; and from Sulawesi of Indonesia .

References

Tortricini
Moths of Oceania
Moths of Indonesia
Lepidoptera of Papua New Guinea
Fauna of Sulawesi
Admiralty Islands
D'Entrecasteaux Islands
Moths described in 1964